Parakai is a town in the  North Island of New Zealand, sited  northwest of Auckland, close to the southern extremity of the Kaipara Harbour.

The surrounding area, particularly to the north and west, consists of dairy farming, sheep farming and deer farming community. West Auckland Airport, a general aviation airfield, is 2 km north of Parakai. It is a popular airfield for parachuting.

History and culture

Pre-European history
Parakai is within the rohe (tribal area) of Ngāti Whatua. They may have settled the area as early as 1370.

European settlement
In the early 1900s a small milk processing factory known as Ambury and English's Creamery existed in Parakai at the corner of Fordyce road and the main road to South Head.

Parakai Rugby Club existed between 1918 and 1937, before amalgamating with the Helensville Rugby club in 1943.

Marae
Haranui Marae, also known as Otakanini Marae, is located 6 km north of Parakai. It is a traditional meeting ground for the Ngāti Whātua o Kaipara and Ngāti Whātua hapū of Ngāti Whātua Tūturu and Te Taoū, and features Ngā Tai i Turia ki te Maro Whara meeting house.

Demographics

Parakai had a population of 1,098 at the 2018 New Zealand census, an increase of 78 people (7.6%) since the 2013 census, and an increase of 267 people (32.1%) since the 2006 census. There were 375 households, comprising 546 males and 552 females, giving a sex ratio of 0.99 males per female. The median age was 37.0 years (compared with 37.4 years nationally), with 261 people (23.8%) aged under 15 years, 171 (15.6%) aged 15 to 29, 489 (44.5%) aged 30 to 64, and 177 (16.1%) aged 65 or older.

Ethnicities were 79.2% European/Pākehā, 24.0% Māori, 6.6% Pacific peoples, 6.6% Asian, and 2.5% other ethnicities. People may identify with more than one ethnicity.

The percentage of people born overseas was 19.4, compared with 27.1% nationally.

Although some people chose not to answer the census's question about religious affiliation, 59.0% had no religion, 25.7% were Christian, 2.7% had Māori religious beliefs, 1.4% were Hindu, 0.5% were Muslim, 0.5% were Buddhist and 1.4% had other religions.

Of those at least 15 years old, 87 (10.4%) people had a bachelor's or higher degree, and 234 (28.0%) people had no formal qualifications. The median income was $26,100, compared with $31,800 nationally. 84 people (10.0%) earned over $70,000 compared to 17.2% nationally. The employment status of those at least 15 was that 405 (48.4%) people were employed full-time, 105 (12.5%) were part-time, and 42 (5.0%) were unemployed.

Governance
Helensville is part of the Local Government Rodney Ward of Auckland Council and is part of the Kumeu Subdivision of the Rodney Local Board.

Helensville is in the Helensville Electorate however proposed Boundary changes in late 2019 could change this.

The original local government was called Helensville Borough Council, which started in 1947 and merged into Rodney District Council in 1989, eventually being amalgamated into Auckland Council in November 2010.

Mayors during Helensville Borough Council
During the 42-year existence of Helensville Borough Council, it had eight mayors:

Economy
Although it is no longer a forestry or dairy centre, the town is still a tourist attraction, largely because of its many historic buildings, the hot springs at Parakai and the Parakai Aerodrome, and its proximity to Auckland. It has also seen positive effects from the nearby wine producing region around Kumeu, 20 km to the south. There are also an increasing number of lifestyle blocks in the area.

Helensville has its own locally produced monthly newspaper called the Helensville News.

The township is in the North West Country Inc business improvement district zone. The business association which represents businesses from Kaukapakapa to Riverhead.

Education
Parakai School is a co-educational full primary school catering for years 1–8, with a roll of  students as of  The Parakai School community catchment area reaches from the immediate flats surrounding the Kaipara River and up the South Kaipara Heads Peninsula.

Geothermal mineral pools
Parakai is noted for its hot springs with geothermal mineral water occurring naturally. There is a complex of mineral pools and recreational activities, such as Parakai Springs. These pools are fed from bores which draw from a geothermal aquifer which lies in the fractured Waitemata sandstone and compacted alluvial sediments.

There is little recorded history of Māori using these springs, though it is to be assumed that they were known as the local iwi Ngāti Whatua had made use of the springs in the neighboring Helensville.

In 1864 Robert Mair "discovered" the hot springs, which at the time consisted of one natural hot pool. In 1905 a bore was sunk 20 metres and a year later a new bathhouse was built. This began twenty-five years of tourism and investment in the hot pools (and Parakai more widely) which, at its peak, included a Reserve which contained a Massage Institute, 24 private baths, and men's and women's swimming baths. The economic downturn of the Depression and onset of World War II caused visitor numbers to dwindle, and by 1958 two of the boarding houses had burned down, and the swimming baths were closed.

Notes

External links

Populated places in the Auckland Region
Hot springs of New Zealand
Landforms of the Auckland Region
Populated places on the Kaipara River
Populated places around the Kaipara Harbour